Leigh railway station is a station in Kent, England

Leigh railway station may refer to:
Leigh-on-Sea railway station in Essex, England
Leigh railway station (Staffordshire), a closed station in Staffordshire, England
Leigh railway station (Lancashire), a closed station in Lancashire, England
Westleigh railway station, originally called Leigh, a closed station in Lancashire, England

See also
 Lee railway station in London, England